This is a list of memorials to Lyndon B. Johnson, the 36th president of the United States.

Buildings
 Lyndon B. Johnson Student Center, a complex including teaching theaters, shops, a student pool hall, and office space located at the Texas State University in San Marcos, Texas; President Johnson's college alma mater.
 Lyndon B. Johnson Tropical Medical Center, a hospital in American Samoa
 Lyndon B. Johnson General Hospital, part of Harris Health System in Houston, Texas
 Lyndon B. Johnson Space Center in Houston, Texas
 Lyndon Baines Johnson Department of Education Building, in Washington, D.C.
 Lyndon Baines Johnson Library and Museum, presidential museum in Austin, Texas

Military vessels
 USS Lyndon B. Johnson (DDG-1002)

Parks and topographical features
 Lyndon B. Johnson National Historical Park, Johnson City, Texas
 Lake Lyndon B. Johnson, a lake in Texas
 Lyndon B. Johnson National Grassland, in Texas
 Lyndon Baines Johnson Memorial Grove on the Potomac, in Washington, D.C.
 FELDA L.B. Johnson, a village settlement in Negeri Sembilan, Malaysia.

Roads
 Lyndon B. Johnson Freeway (Interstate 635), a freeway in Dallas, Texas

Schools
 Lyndon B. Johnson Elementary School in Jackson, Kentucky
 Lyndon B. Johnson High School (Austin, Texas)
 Lyndon B. Johnson High School (Johnson City, Texas)
 Lyndon B. Johnson High School (Laredo, Texas)
 Lyndon B. Johnson Middle School in Melbourne, Florida
 Lyndon B. Johnson School of Public Affairs, a public affairs graduate school at the University of Texas at Austin
Johnson Elementary in Bryan, Texas

Clubs and Organizations
 The K5LBJ Amateur Radio Club is operated within LASA High School and is named after LBJ High School in Austin, Texas from its founding when LASA and LBJ were one high school.

See also
 Presidential memorials in the United States

Johnson, Lyndon
Memorials
Johnson, Lyndon